The Filaret Association (also translated as filaret(e)s, philaret(e)s; , Towarzystwo Przyjaciół Pożytecznej Zabawy, filareci; from the Greek philáretos, "lovers of virtue") was a secret student organization created in 1820 by Tomasz Zan within the Philomates following the dissolution, under pressure from Vilnius University authorities, of the . The Filaretes continued the latter's tradition, with the stated aims of supporting fellow students through good advice, and more unofficially, promoting Polish culture and patriotism. They had about 176 members in 1822. The Association was disbanded in 1823 following the arrests of the Philomathes.

Prominent members:
Tomasz Zan
Jan Czeczot
Franciszek Malewski
Adam Mickiewicz
Aleksander Chodźko
Ignacy Domeyko
Antoni Edward Odyniec

References

1820 establishments in Europe
1823 disestablishments in Europe
History of Lithuania (1795–1918)
Secret societies
Polish independence organisations
History of Vilnius
Student organizations established in 1820